The 1992 Canadian Open was a combined men's and women's tennis tournament played on outdoor hard courts. It was the 103rd edition of the Canada Masters, and was part of the ATP Super 9 of the 1992 ATP Tour, and of the Tier I Series of the 1992 WTA Tour. The men's event took place at the National Tennis Centre in Toronto, Ontario, Canada, from July 20 through July 26, 1992, and the women's event at the Uniprix Stadium in Montreal, Quebec, Canada, from August 17 through August 23, 1992.

Finals

Men's singles

 Andre Agassi defeated  Ivan Lendl 3–6, 6–2, 6–0
It was Andre Agassi's 3rd title of the year and his 17th overall. It was his 1st Masters title of the year and his 2nd overall.

Women's singles

 Arantxa Sánchez Vicario defeated  Monica Seles 6–3, 4–6, 6–4
It was Arantxa Sánchez Vicario's 2nd title of the year and her 8th overall. It was her 1st Tier I title.

Men's doubles

 Patrick Galbraith /  Danie Visser defeated  Andre Agassi /  John McEnroe 6–4, 6–4

Women's doubles

 Lori McNeil /  Rennae Stubbs defeated  Gigi Fernández /  Natasha Zvereva 3–6, 7–5, 7–5

References

Canadian Open
Canadian Open
Canadian Open (tennis)
1992 in Canadian tennis